Calcium glubionate (or glubionate calcium) is a mineral supplement that is used to treat hypocalcemia.

References 

Calcium compounds